Aristolochia is a large plant genus with over 500 species that is the type genus of the family Aristolochiaceae. Its members are commonly known as birthwort, pipevine or Dutchman's pipe and are widespread and occur in the most diverse climates. Some species, like A. utriformis and A. westlandii, are threatened with extinction.

Isotrema is usually included here, but might be a valid genus. If so, it contains those species with a three-lobed calyx.

Description

Aristolochia is a genus of evergreen and deciduous lianas (woody vines) and herbaceous perennials. The smooth stem is erect or somewhat twining. The simple leaves are alternate and cordate, membranous, growing on leaf stalks. There are no stipules.

The flowers grow in the leaf axils. They are inflated and globose at the base, continuing as a long perianth tube, ending in a tongue-shaped, brightly colored lobe. There is no corolla. The calyx is one to three whorled, and three to six toothed. The sepals are united (gamosepalous). There are six to 40 stamens in one whorl. They are united with the style, forming a gynostemium. The ovary is inferior and is four to six locular.

These flowers have a specialized pollination mechanism. The plants are aromatic and their strong scent attracts insects. The inner part of the perianth tube is covered with hairs, acting as a fly-trap. These hairs then wither to release the fly, covered with pollen.

The fruit is dehiscent capsule with many endospermic seeds.

The common names Dutchman's pipe and pipevine (e.g. common pipevine, A. durior) are an allusion to old-fashioned meerschaum pipes at one time common in the Netherlands and northern Germany. Birthwort (e.g. European birthwort A. clematitis) refers to these species' flower shape, resembling a birth canal. 
Aristolochia was first described by the 4th c. BC Greek philosopher and botanist Theophrastus in his ‘’Inquiry of Plants’’ [IX.8.3], and the scientific name Aristolochia was developed from Ancient Greek aristos (άριστος) "best" + locheia (λοχεία), childbirth or childbed, relating to its known ancient use in childbirth. The Roman orator Cicero records a different tradition, that the plant was named for the otherwise unknown individual with the common Greek name Aristolochos, who had learned from a dream that it was an antidote for snake bites.

Selected species

 Aristolochia acuminata Lam. 
 Aristolochia arborea 
 Aristolochia baetica
 Aristolochia boosii
 Aristolochia bracteolata Lam. – worm killer
 Aristolochia californica Torr. – California pipevine, California Dutchman's pipe
 Aristolochia cauliflora Ule

 Aristolochia chilensis Bridges ex Lindl. – Chilean fox's ears
 Aristolochia clematitis L. – European birthwort
 Aristolochia contorta
 Aristolochia cucurbitifolia Hayata
 Aristolochia cucurbitoides C.F.Liang

 Aristolochia delavayi Franch.
 Aristolochia didyma – yawar panga
 Aristolochia durior (= A. macrophylla) – common Dutchman's pipe, common pipevine
 Aristolochia eriantha
 Aristolochia esperanzae Kuntze
 Aristolochia fimbriata – white-veined Dutchman's pipe
 Aristolochia gibertii
 Aristolochia gigantea Mart. – giant pelican flower, Brazilian Dutchman's pipe
 Aristolochia gorgona
 Aristolochia grandiflora Sw. – pelican flower
 Aristolochia hainanensis Merr.
 Aristolochia indica L.
 Aristolochia labiata Willd. – mottled Dutchman's pipe, rooster flower
 Aristolochia lindneri 

 Aristolochia littoralis D.Parodi – elegant Dutchman's pipe, calico flower
 Aristolochia longa – long aristolochia, sarrasine
 Aristolochia macrophylla Lam. 
 Aristolochia macroura

 Aristolochia maxima Jacq. – Florida Dutchman's pipe
 Aristolochia obliqua S.M.Hwang
 Aristolochia paecilantha
 Aristolochia pistolochia L.
 Aristolochia pontica
 Aristolochia quangbinhensis
 Aristolochia ringens Vahl – gaping Dutchman's pipe
 Aristolochia rotunda L. – smearwort, round birthwort, English mercury, mercury goosefoot, allgood, tola bona, fat hen – type species
 Aristolochia scytophylla S.M.Hwang & D.L.Chen
 Aristolochia sempervirens L.
 Aristolochia serpentaria L. – Virginia snakeroot
 Aristolochia sipho L'Hér.
 Aristolochia stevensii  Barringer 
 Aristolochia tagala – Indian birthwort
 Aristolochia thwaitesii Hook
 Aristolochia tomentosa Sims – woolly pipevine, woolly Dutchman's pipe
 Aristolochia tricaudata
 Aristolochia tuberosa C.F.Liang & S.M.Hwang
 Aristolochia utriformis S.M.Hwang
 Aristolochia watsonii Woot. & Standl. – Watson's Dutchman's pipe
 Aristolochia westlandii Hemsl.
 Aristolochia yunnanensis Franch.

Swallowtail butterflies
Many species of Aristolochia are eaten by the caterpillar larvae of swallowtail butterflies, thus making themselves unpalatable to most predators. Lepidoptera feeding on pipevines include:

Choreutidae
Millieria leaf miner
Papilionidae
False Apollo (Archon apollinus) – known from numerous pipevine species
Bhutanitis
Bhutan glory (B. lidderdalii) – known from A. griffithi, A. kaempferii, A. mandshuriensis and maybe others
Chinese three-tailed swallowtail (B. thaidina) – known from A. moupinensis
Troidini
Great windmill (Atrophaneura dasarada) – only known from A. griffithi
Common batwing (Atrophaneura varuna) – only known from A. kaempferi
Troides plateni – only known from Indian birthwort (A. tagala)
Cairns birdwing (Ornithoptera euphorion)
Richmond birdwing (O. richmondia)
Paradise birdwing (O. paradisea)
Rajah Brooke's birdwing (Trogonoptera brookiana) – only known from A. foveolata
Magellan birdwing (T. magellanus) – known on A. cucurbitifolia, A. ovatifolia, A. zollingeriana and maybe others
Pipevine swallowtail (Battus philenor) – known on A. macrophylla, Virginia snakeroot (A. serpentaria) and others
Polydamas Swallowtail (Battus polydamas)
Parides genus of swallowtails, also called cattlehearts
Zerynthiini
Allancastria caucasica
Eastern Festoon (Allancastria cerisyi) – known from numerous pipevine species 
Southern Festoon (Zerynthia polyxena) – known from numerous pipevine species 
Spanish Festoon (Zerynthia rumina) – known from numerous pipevine species

In Australia the invasive Aristolochia littoralis is fatal to the caterpillars of Ornithoptera euphorion and O. richmondia and threatens to displace their proper host, A. tagala.

Herbalism, toxicity and carcinogenicity
The species Aristolochia clematitis was highly regarded as a medicinal plant since the ancient Egyptians, Greeks and Romans, and on until the Early Modern era; it also plays a role in traditional Chinese medicine. Due to its resemblance to the uterus, the doctrine of signatures held that birthwort was useful in childbirth. A preparation was given to women upon delivery to expel the placenta, as noted by the herbalist Dioscurides in the 1st century AD. Despite its presence in ancient medicine, Aristolochia is known to contain the lethal toxin aristolochic acid.

The Bencao Gangmu, compiled by Li Shi-Zhen in the latter part of the sixteenth century, was based on the author's experience and on data obtained from earlier herbals; this Chinese herbal classic describes 1892 "drugs" (with 1110 drawings), including many species of Aristolochia. For 400 years, the Bencao Gangmu remained the principal source of information in traditional Chinese medicine and the work was translated into numerous languages, reflecting its influence in countries other than China. In the mid-twentieth century, the Bencao Gangmu was replaced by modern Materia Medica, the most comprehensive source being Zhong Hua Ben Cao (Encyclopedia of Chinese Materia Medica), published in 1999. The Encyclopedia lists 23 species of Aristolochia, though with little mention of toxicity. The Chinese government currently lists the following Aristolochia herbs: A. manshuriensis (stems), A. fangchi (root), A. debilis (root and fruit), and A. contorta (fruit), two of which (madouling and qingmuxiang) appear in the 2005 Pharmacopoeia of the People's Republic of China.

In traditional Chinese medicine Aristolochia species are used for certain forms of acute arthritis and edema.

Despite the toxic properties of aristolochic acid, naturopaths claim that a decoction of birthwort stimulates the production and increases the activity of white blood cells, or that pipevines contain a disinfectant which assists in wound healing. Also, Aristolochia bracteolata is colloquially known as "worm killer" due to supposed antihelminthic activity.

Aristolochia taxa have also been used as reptile repellents. A. serpentaria (Virginia snakeroot) is thus named because the root was used to treat snakebite, as "so offensive to these reptiles, that they not only avoid the places where it grows, but even flee from the traveler who carries a piece of it in his hand". A. pfeiferi, A. rugosa, and A. trilobata are also used in folk medicine to treat snakebites.

Toxicity and carcinogenicity
In 1993, a series of end-stage renal disease cases was reported from Belgium associated with a weight loss treatment, where Stephania tetrandra in a herbal preparation was suspected of being replaced with Aristolochia fangchi. More than 105 patients were identified with nephropathy following the ingestion of this preparation from the same clinic from 1990 to 1992. Many required renal transplantation or dialysis. Aristolochia is a component of some Chinese herbal medicines.

Aristolochia has been shown to be both a potent carcinogen and kidney toxin. Herbal compounds containing Aristolochia are classified as a Group 1 carcinogen by the International Agency for Research on Cancer. Epidemiological and laboratory studies have identified Aristolochia to be a dangerous kidney toxin; Aristolochia has been shown to be associated with more than 100 cases of kidney failure. Furthermore, it appears as if contamination of grain with European birthwort (A. clematitis) is a cause of Balkan nephropathy, a severe renal disease occurring in parts of southeast Europe. In 2001 the UK government banned the sale, supply and importation of any medicinal product consisting of or containing a plant of the genus Aristolochia. Several other plant species that do not cause themselves kidney poisoning, but which were commonly substituted with Aristolochia in the remedies, were prohibited in the same order.

Aristolochic acid was linked to aristolochic acid-associated urothelial cancer in a Taiwanese study in 2012. In 2013, two studies reported that aristolochic acid is a strong carcinogen. Whole-genome and exome analysis of individuals with a known exposure to aristolochic acid revealed a higher rate of somatic mutation in DNA. Metabolites of aristolochic acid enter the cell nucleus and form adducts on DNA. While adducts on the transcribed DNA strand within genes are detected and removed by transcription-coupled repair, the adducts on the non-transcribed strand remain and eventually cause DNA replication errors. These adducts have a preference for adenine bases, and cause A-to-T transversions. Furthermore, these metabolites appear to show a preference for CAG and TAG sequences.

Garden history
Due to their spectacular flowers, several species are used as ornamental plants, notably the hardy A. durior of eastern North America, which was one of John Bartram's many introductions to British gardens; in 1761 Bartram sent seeds he had collected in the Ohio River Valley to Peter Collinson in London, and Collinson gave them to the nurseryman James Gordon at Mile End to raise. The vine was soon adopted for creating for arbors "a canopy impenetrable to the rays of the sun, or moderate rain," as Dr John Sims noted in The Botanical Magazine, 1801.

See also
 Nepenthes aristolochioides, a carnivorous plant with pitchers resembling Aristolochia flowers
 Opodeldoc

Footnotes

References 
  (2006): Known and Probable Carcinogens (Including Industrial Processes, Occupational Exposures, Infectious Agents, Chemicals, and Radiation). Version of 02/03/2006. Retrieved 2007-NOV-12.

Further reading

External links

 Pictures of Aristolochia chilensis and Aristolochia bridgesii

 
Vines
Piperales genera
Abortifacients
Medicinal plants
IARC Group 1 carcinogens